The Military Star is a military decoration awarded to those members of the Irish Defence Forces or Chaplaincy Service who were killed or mortally wounded in the line of duty as a result of hostile action by an armed enemy. Initially only awarded for service related deaths that occurred outside of Ireland, in 2012 the award criteria were changed to allow awards for those killed in Ireland.

Appearance
The obverse of the medal depicts Cúchulainn in death in the centre of the medal. The reverse is blank so that the deceased soldier's name, army number, and date and location of death may be engraved.

The ribbon is purple with  black stripes at the edge. The white stripe is bordered by  green stripes on either side.

The ribbon is suspended at the top from a bronze bar bearing the word, in relief, REMEMBRANCE.

The medal and ribbon were designed by Corporal Dan O'Connell, Defence Forces Ceremonial (now retired).

References

External links

Military of the Republic of Ireland
Orders, decorations, and medals of Ireland